Francesco Campanari (1555–1632) was a Roman Catholic prelate who served as Bishop of Alatri (1620–1632).

Biography
Francesco Campanari was born in Veroli, Italy in 1555.
On 16 November 1620, he was appointed during the papacy of Pope Paul V as Bishop of Alatri.
On 30 November 1620, he was consecrated bishop by Giambattista Leni, Bishop of Ferrara, with Raffaele Inviziati, Bishop Emeritus of Cefalonia e Zante, and Francesco Mottini, Bishop of Brugnato, serving as co-consecrators. 
He served as Bishop of Alatri until his death in 1632.

References

External links and additional sources
 (for Chronology of Bishops) 
 (for Chronology of Bishops)  

17th-century Italian Roman Catholic bishops
Bishops appointed by Pope Paul V
1555 births
1632 deaths